Robert James Isaac Jacobson (15 November 1885 – 20 June 1949) was a former Australian rules footballer who played with Carlton in the Victorian Football League (VFL).

Notes

External links 

		
Bob Jacobson's profile at Blueseum

1885 births
Australian rules footballers from Melbourne
Carlton Football Club players
1949 deaths
People from South Melbourne